Mohammad Ali is an Independent politician and the former Member of Parliament of Noakhali-6.

Career
Ali was elected to parliament from Noakhali-6 as an Independent candidate in 2001.

References

Living people
Awami League politicians
Independent politicians in Bangladesh
8th Jatiya Sangsad members
Year of birth missing (living people)
People from Hatiya Upazila
20th-century Bengalis